Point Perpendicular is a point at the southern tip of the Beecroft Peninsula and at the northern entry to Jervis Bay, in New South Wales, Australia. It is the location of Point Perpendicular Light, a historic lighthouse which was active from 1889 to 1993, and a replacement skeletal tower which is active.

The lighthouse and its grounds are an exclave of the state of New South Wales.

References

Climbing areas of Australia
Headlands of New South Wales
Tourist attractions in New South Wales